Teddy Bruckshot may refer to:

 An alias used by English MC Stormin (1984–2018)
 Teddy Bruck Shut, a fictional character in the 2002 film Shottas